was a Japanese nationalist and Pan-Asianist writer, known for his publications on Japanese history, philosophy of religion, Indian philosophy, and colonialism.

Background 
Ōkawa was born in Sakata, Yamagata, Japan in 1886. He graduated from Tokyo Imperial University in 1911, where he had studied Vedic literature and classical Indian philosophy. After graduation, Ōkawa worked for the Imperial Japanese Army General Staff doing translation work. He had a sound knowledge of German, French, English, Sanskrit and Pali.

He briefly flirted with socialism in his college years, but in the summer of 1913 he read a copy of Sir Henry Cotton's New India, or India in transition (1886, revised 1905) which dealt with the contemporary political situation. After reading this book, Ōkawa abandoned "complete cosmopolitanism" (sekaijin) for Pan-Asianism. Later that year articles by Anagarika Dharmapala and Maulavi Barkatullah appeared in the magazine Michi, published by Dōkai, a religious organization in which Ōkawa was later to play a prominent part. While he studied, he briefly housed the Indian independence leader Rash Behari Bose.

After years of study of foreign philosophies, he became increasingly convinced that the solution to Japan's pressing social and political problems lay in an alliance with Asian independence movements, a revival of pre-modern Japanese philosophy, and a renewed emphasis on the kokutai principles.

In 1918, Ōkawa went to work for the South Manchurian Railway Company, under its East Asian Research Bureau. Together with Ikki Kita he founded the nationalist discussion group and political club Yūzonsha. In the 1920s, he became an instructor of history and colonial policy at Takushoku University, where he was also active in the creation of anti-capitalist and nationalist student groups. Meanwhile, he introduced Rudolf Steiner's theory of social threefolding to Japan. He developed a friendship with Aikido founder Morihei Ueshiba during this time period.

In 1926, Ōkawa published his most influential work: , which was so popular that it was reprinted 46 times by the end of World War II. Ōkawa also became involved in a number of attempted coups d'état by the Japanese military in the early 1930s, including the March Incident, for which he was sentenced to five years in prison in 1935. Released after only two years, he briefly re-joined the South Manchurian Railway Company before accepting a post as a professor at Hosei University in 1939. He continued to publish numerous books and articles, helping popularize the idea that a "clash of civilizations" between the East and West was inevitable, and that Japan was destined to assume the mantle of liberator and protector of Asia against the United States and other Western nations.

Tokyo War Crimes Tribunal 

After World War II, the Allies prosecuted Ōkawa as a class-A war criminal. Of the twenty-eight people indicted with this charge, he was the only one not a military officer or government official. The Allies described him to the press as the "Japanese Goebbels" and said he had long agitated for a war between Japan and the West. In pre-trial hearings, Ōkawa said that he had merely translated and commented on Vladimir Solovyov's geopolitical philosophy in 1924, and that in fact Pan-Asianism did not advocate for war.

During the trial, Ōkawa behaved erratically, including dressing in pajamas, sitting barefoot, and slapping the head of former prime minister Hideki Tōjō while shouting in German "Inder! Kommen Sie!" (Come, Indian!). Ōkawa maintained since the beginning of the trial that the court was a farce and not even worthy of being called a legal court. He also at one point shouted "This is act one of the comedy!". U.S. Army psychiatrist Daniel Jaffe examined him and reported that he was unfit to stand trial. The presiding judge Sir William Webb concluded that he was mentally ill and dropped the case against him. Some believed that he was feigning madness. Of the remaining defendants, seven were hanged and the rest imprisoned.

After the war 
Ōkawa was transferred from jail to a US Army hospital in Japan, which confirmed his mental illness caused by syphilis. Later, he was transferred to Tokyo Metropolitan Matsuzawa Hospital, a mental hospital, where he completed the third Japanese translation of the entire Quran. He was released from hospital in 1948, shortly after the end of the trial. He spent the final years of his life writing a memoir, Anraku no Mon, reflecting on how he found peace in the mental hospital.

In October 1957, Prime Minister of India Jawaharlal Nehru requested an audience with him during a brief visit to Japan. The invitation was hand-delivered to Ōkawa's house by an Indian Embassy official, who found that Ōkawa was already on his deathbed and was unable to leave the house. He died on 24 December 1957.

Major publications 
 Some issues in re-emerging Asia (復興亜細亜の諸問題), 1922
 A study of the Japanese spirit (日本精神研究), 1924
 A study of chartered colonisation companies (特許植民会社制度研究), 1927
 National History (国史読本), 1931
 2600 years of the Japanese history (日本二千六百年史), 1939
 History of Anglo-American Aggression in East Asia (米英東亜侵略史), 1941
 Best-seller in Japan during WW2
 Introduction to Islam (回教概論), 1942
 Quran (Japanese translation), 1950

Notes

References

Further reading

External links 

 Ōkawa hitting Tojo illustration

1886 births
1957 deaths
20th-century Japanese historians
20th-century Japanese translators
Deaths from asthma
Historians of Japan
Far-right politics in Japan
Japanese anti-capitalists
Japanese nationalists
Japanese non-fiction writers
Japanese fascists
Shōwa Statism
Academic staff of Hosei University
Pan-Asianists
People acquitted by reason of insanity
People from Yamagata Prefecture
People indicted for war crimes
Academic staff of Takushoku University
Translators of the Quran into Japanese
University of Tokyo alumni